Georges Colin (10 March 1880 – 14 January 1945) was a French actor.

Selected filmography
 The Kiddies in the Ruins (1918)
 The Prosecutor Hallers (1930)
 The Train of Suicides (1931)
 The Eaglet (1931)
 End of the World (1931)
 Madame Angot's Daughter (1935)
 Claudine at School (1937)
 Street of Shadows (1937)
 The Call of Life (1937)
 The Benefactor (1942)
 The Count of Monte Cristo (1943)

References

External links
 

1880 births
1945 deaths
French male film actors
French male silent film actors
Male actors from Paris
20th-century French male actors